Marco Santiangeli (born August 12, 1991) is an Italian professional basketball player who currently plays for U.C.C. Piacenza in the Italian Serie A2 Basket second tier national league.

International career

Santiangeli won the silver medal with the U20's at the 2011 European Championship.

Honours

Team

International
European Under-20 Championship
2011 Bilbao

External links
 Marco Santiangeli at FIBA.com.

1991 births
Living people
Italian men's basketball players
Sportspeople from the Province of Macerata
Scafati Basket players
Small forwards